James Lee (Korean: Jeong-Hwan Lee, born 1979) is a South Korean operatic tenor who made a career mainly in Europe, focused on roles of the Italian opera repertoire.

Awards 

 First prize International Singing Competition Masters of Lyrical Art – Valentin Teodorian in Bucharest
 First prize and special prize at the Competizione dell’Opera 2013 in Linz

References

External links 
 
 James Lee (management) omegamusicmanagement.com
 Operabase

1979 births
Living people
South Korean opera singers
Operatic tenors